The Emergency Military Unit (UME) is a branch of the Spanish Armed Forces responsible for providing disaster relief throughout Spain mainly,  and abroad if required. It is the newest branch of the Spanish Armed Forces.

History
The decision to create the Military Emergencies Unit was agreed upon at a cabinet meeting of the Zapatero administration on October 7, 2005. This was enacted in law by the Real Decreto 416/2006 (Royal Decree 416/2006) on April 11, 2006.

Missions
 Intervention during emergencies that have their origin in natural hazards; among these are floods, spill-overs, earthquakes, land slides, large snow storms and other adverse weather conditions.
 Intervention fighting forest fires.
 Intervention during emergencies derived from technological hazards; among which are chemical, nuclear, radiological and biological hazards
 Intervention during emergencies as a consequence of terrorist attacks or illicit or violent acts, including those acts against critical infrastructures, dangerous installations or with nuclear, biological, radiological or chemical agents.
 Intervention during situations of environmental contamination.
 Intervention during any other emergency deemed appropriate by the Prime Minister of Spain.

Chiefs

Organisation
The UME consists of Headquarters (UCG), *five emergency intervention battalions (BIEM), 
 a support regiment (RAEM), 
 a communications battalion (BTUME) and 
 an aviation group (AGRUMEDA)

Ranks

Officers

Enlisted

Gallery

See also
 2011 Lorca earthquake
 Directorate-General for Civil Protection and Emergencies

References

External links
 Official website

Military of Spain
Military units and formations established in 2006
Emergency management in Spain
Military operations other than war